Lowdon B. Heller (February 24, 1924 – May 28, 2016) was an American politician in the state of South Dakota. He was a member of the South Dakota House of Representatives from 1957 to 1960. He was an alumnus of the University of South Dakota and South Dakota State University, and was later a businessman, teacher and farmer. He died aged 92 in 2016.

References

1924 births
2016 deaths
People from Tripp County, South Dakota
South Dakota State University alumni
University of South Dakota alumni
Businesspeople from South Dakota
Educators from South Dakota
Farmers from South Dakota
Democratic Party members of the South Dakota House of Representatives
20th-century American businesspeople